Gillean Robert Maclaine of Lochbuie (3 January 1921 – 5 May 1970)
was the 25th hereditary Chief of Clan Maclaine of Lochbuie and Feudal Baron of Moy.

Son of Kenneth Douglas Lorne MacLaine, 24th of Lochbuie, and Olive Marguerite Stewart- Richardson. Married Noreen Olive Beadon; one son, Lorne Maclaine.

In August 1942 he received an emergency commission into The Black Watch (Royal Highland Regiment) and immediately transferred to the Glider Pilot Regiment. By 1944 he was serving as Section Commander, F Squadron ( No. 2 Wing), The Glider Pilot Regiment, part of the Airborne Forces at Arnhem. By the time of his retirement, as an Hon. Captain on 25 November 1953, he had transferred back to The Black Watch.

References

1921 births
1970 deaths
Scottish clan chiefs
People from Argyll and Bute
Black Watch officers
Glider Pilot Regiment officers
British Army personnel of World War II
20th-century Scottish businesspeople